Miss Columbia is the female personification of the United States of America.

Miss Columbia may also refer to:

 Miss Columbia (WB-2), an airplane, S/N#1, for the Wright-Bellanca WB-2

See also
 Miss District of Columbia (disambiguation), a beauty pageant title
 Miss Colombia (disambiguation)
 Miss America (disambiguation)
 Columbia (disambiguation)
 Colombia (disambiguation)